Mike van Diem (born 1959, in Druten, grew up in Sittard) is a Dutch film director.

In 1990, his short film Alaska won a Golden Calf for best short film and the Student Academy Award for best foreign student film in the drama category. In 1998, he received the Academy Award for Best Foreign Language Film for the film Character based on the 1938 novel Karakter by Ferdinand Bordewijk.

He has also directed commercials.

Selected filmography
 Character (1997)
 The Surprise (2015)
 Tulipani, Love, Honour and a Bicycle (2017)

References

External links
 

1959 births
Living people
Dutch film directors
Golden Calf winners
Directors of Best Foreign Language Film Academy Award winners
People from Sittard